Bryon is an English-derived given name. Notable people with the given name include:

Bryon Allen (born 1992), American basketball player for Hapoel Eilat of the Israeli Basketball Premier League
Bizzy Bone (born 1976 as Bryon McCane), American rapper
Bryon Baltimore (born 1952), Canadian former NHL and WHA player
Bryon Butler (1934–2001), English writer and broadcaster
Bryon Nickoloff (1956–2004), Canadian international chess master
Bryon Russell (born 1970), American basketball player
Bryon Wilfert (born 1952), Canadian politician

See also
Brian, a given name
Bryonia (common name bryony), a genus of flowering plants
Bryony (given name)
Bryonycta, a genus of moths
Byron (disambiguation)
Byron (name), given name and surname